The 2016 WNBA season was the 17th season for the Seattle Storm of the Women's National Basketball Association. The season began on May 14 and ended on September 18.

Transactions

WNBA Draft

Trades

Roster

Statistics

Regular season

Awards and honors

References

External links
THE OFFICIAL SITE OF THE SEATTLE STORM

Seattle Storm seasons
Seattle
2016 in sports in Washington (state)
Storm